Sphingobacterium cladoniae is a Gram-negative and strictly aerobic bacterium from the genus of Sphingobacterium which has been isolated from the lichen cladonia from the Geogeum Island in Korea.

References

External links
Type strain of Sphingobacterium cladoniae at BacDive -  the Bacterial Diversity Metadatabase

Sphingobacteriia
Bacteria described in 2013